Electric Citizen are an American rock band from Cincinnati, Ohio formed in 2012. The group's current lineup consists of Laura Busse (lead vocals), Ross Dolan (guitar), Nick Vogelpohl (bass), and Nate Wagner (drums).

History

Formation and Sateen (2012–2015) 
Vogelpohl and Wagner had previously performed in the indie rock band the Lions Rampant before moving in 2012 to Cincinnati, where they met Ross Dolan and his wife Laura Busse. Together the four formed Electric Citizen, named after the Edgar Broughton Band song, "Death of an Electric Citizen". Yusef Quotah initially joined the group on keyboards, but lost interest within a few months of his involvement for reasons uncertain. On September 21, 2013, the group performed at Doomslang Festival in Lexington, Kentucky.

The group would eventually be signed to RidingEasy Records, releasing their debut album, Sateen, on June 1, 2014. To promote the album, a music video for the track "Light Years Beyond" was produced and released on RidingEasy's YouTube channel. The group toured following the album's release, performing alongside such acts as Haunted Leather, The Budos Band and Fu Manchu. In the spring of 2015 the group toured California as a lead-up to their performance at Psycho California in Santa Ana on May 25, 2015. Shortly afterward, Vogelpohl left the group, and Randy Proctor was brought in as the new bassist. The group then embarked on two national tours with Pentagram.

Higher Time and Helltown (2016–Present) 
The group's second album, Higher Time, was released on May 13, 2016. The album was recorded at Mt. Saturn Studios in Cincinnati and was produced by former member of The Greenhornes Brian Olive. Throughout 2016, Electric Citizen would embark on two tours of Europe, their first performances overseas. The group first appeared with Wolfmother, before touring with Horisont in the fall of 2016, a tour which culminated in their performance at Desertfest Belgium in Antwerp. The group then toured in February 2017 with The Crazy World of Arthur Brown before beginning work on their next record. During this period, Vogelpohl returned to the group on bass for another national tour.

The group's third album, Helltown, was released on September 28, 2018. A music video for the track "Hide it in the Night" was released to promote the album. The group subsequently toured with Monster Magnet before appearing at Psycho Smokeout Los Angeles on April 20, 2019. The group then made a headlining tour of Europe in May 2019, making appearances at Desertfest in Berlin and London. On August 16, 2019, the group appeared at Psycho Las Vegas.

The group went on hiatus in late 2019 and remained inactive for three years. In 2022 it was announced that the band would be embarking on a comeback tour of Europe as a supporting act for Fu Manchu, including a performance at the Up In Smoke festival in Basel.

Members

Current members 

 Laura Busse – vocals
 Ross Dolan – guitar
 Nick Vogelpohl – bass (2012–2015, 2017–present), keyboards (2013-2015, 2017-present)
 Nate Wagner – drums

Past members 

 Randy Proctor – bass (2015–2017)
 Yusef Quotah – keyboards

Timeline

Discography

Studio albums 

 Sateen (2014, RidingEasy)
 Higher Time (2016, RidingEasy)
 Helltown (2018, RidingEasy)

EPs 

 Electric Citizen (The Crossing, 2013)

References 

 https://www.facebook.com/ElectricCitizen/
 
 https://www.facebook.com/ElectricCitizen/photos/a.123782964458990.1073741837.108733349297285/256329461204339/?type=3&theater
 https://www.facebook.com/ElectricCitizen/photos/a.113837975453489.1073741833.108733349297285/547625598741389/?type=3

External links 

 http://electriccitizenband.com/
 https://electriccitizenband.bandcamp.com/

Rock music groups from Ohio